

Arthropods

Insects

Archosauromorphs

Newly named phytosaurs

Plesiosaurs

Newly named plesiosaurs

References

1850s in paleontology
Paleontology